The 1906 Tennessee gubernatorial election was held on November 6, 1906. Democratic nominee Malcolm R. Patterson defeated Republican nominee Henry Clay Evans with 54.42% of the vote.

General election

Candidates
Major party candidates
Malcolm R. Patterson, Democratic
Henry Clay Evans, Republican 

Other candidates
John M. Ray, Socialist

Results

References

1906
Tennessee
Gubernatorial